Helmer Grundström (29 February 1904 - 29 May 1986) was a Swedish writer and poet, born in the village of Svanavattnet in Ångermanland. Grundström was deeply associated with the Swedish workers’ movement and is characterized as a proletarian author.

Some of his poems have been interpreted by Swedish folk singers Thorstein Bergman and Tor Bergner and are featured on the album Langt nol i väla / Dikter av Helmer Grundström, along with poems read by the author himself.

References

External links
Helmer Grundström-sällskapet
Author Helmer Grundströms archive

Swedish male writers
1904 births
1986 deaths
Swedish male poets